Science Research Associates (SRA) was a Chicago-based publisher of educational materials and schoolroom reading comprehension products. The company was acquired by McGraw-Hill Education in the early 2000s.

History
Science Research Associates Inc. was founded in 1938 with a trade and occupational focus. In 1957, it moved into individualized classroom instruction with the iconic SRA Reading Laboratory Kit, a format that they translated to mathematics, science, and social studies commonly called SRA cards. The labs were large boxes filled with color-coded cardboard sheets, and each sheet included a reading exercise for students. Each student would work on it independently of the other students in the class, consulting with the teacher only if he got stuck. The student would then follow up with multiple choice questions. As the child moved ahead, the cards would advance in difficulty.

SRA was purchased by IBM in 1964. By this time, the company's line of primary and secondary school products had increased. Among the new products was the National Educational Development Tests, a series of standardized tests sold to schools as a method of testing students' likelihood of qualifying for tertiary education. SRA produced both IBM PC and Apple II software in the 1980s. Maxwell Communications Corporation bought SRA in 1988, and it became part of Macmillan/McGraw-Hill in 1989. Maxwell Communications collapsed, and McGraw-Hill acquired full ownership of Macmillan/McGraw-Hill and SRA.

Educational programs
Since the 1960s, SRA has been the publisher of Direct Instruction programs, also known as DISTAR (Direct Instruction System for Teaching Arithmetic and Reading).  These include Language for Learning, Reading Mastery, Reasoning and Writing, Connecting Math Concepts and Corrective Reading.  SRA acquired Everyday Mathematics and purchased Open Court Reading in the 1990s.

In the early 2000s, the company was purchased by McGraw-Hill Education. The brand name and products were made part of the PreK-12 business of the company.  The Imagine It! reading program was launched in 2007.  McGraw-Hill Education also competes as a publisher of mathematics and science materials with programs such as Real Math, Number Worlds and Snapshots Video Science.

See also
Siegfried Engelmann

References

External links
IBM Timeline

Former IBM subsidiaries
Reading (process)
United States
Textbook publishing companies
Publishing companies established in 1938
Educational publishing companies
1938 establishments in Illinois